Dingiswayo (c. 1780 – 1817) (born Godongwana) was a Mthethwa king, well known for his mentorship over a young Zulu general, Shaka Zulu, who rose to become the greatest of the Zulu Kings. His father was the Mthethwa king, Jobe kaKayi. It was under Dingiswayo that the Mthethwa rose to prominence, mostly employing diplomacy and assimilation of nearby chiefdoms to strengthen his power base.  According to Mthethwa (1995), the Mthethwas are descended from the Nguni peoples of northern Natal and the Lubombo Mountains, whose modern identity dates back some 700 years.

Lineage
Dingiswayo's lineage can be traced back to Mthethwa the first. It is possible that Dingiswayo and Zwide kaLanga shared the same lineage through Xaba KaMadungu. Zwide was the king of the Ndwandwe, Khumalo, Msene, and Jele peoples. (There does not appear to be a direct family link between Zwide kaLanga and Soshangane kaZikode of the Nxumalo people).

Dingiswayo's Mthethwa family line is stated by Muzi Mthethwa (1995) as follows:

 Dingiswayo
 Jobe
 Khayi
 Xaba
 Madungu
 Simamane and Wengwe
 Ndlovu
 Khubazi
 Nyambose
 Mthethwa

Early life
We first hear of Godongwana during the wanderings of Nandi and her illegitimate son Shaka, who settled with the Mthethwa under King Jobe. Godongwana and his brother, Tana, plotted against their father Jobe, but their plot was discovered. Tana was killed and Godongwana made his escape. Nursed back to health by a sister, the young man found refuge in the foothills of the Drakensberg among the Qwabe and Langeni people. He changed his name to Dingiswayo, which means "one in distress or in exile".

Chief of the Mthethwas
Upon the death of his father, he returned to claim the chieftainship. He found his brother Mawewe in power. He displaced him without resistance. Mawewe fled, but was lured back and killed.

Captain Goddard Edward Donovan and Dr Andrew Cowan of the 83rd Regiment who were exploring a Southern approach to the African interior and were possibly murdered by chief Phakathwayo, and Dingiswayo subsequently acquired Cowan's horse and gun. Dingiswayo's new military tactics were an adoption of western techniques of drills and formation movements under a chain of command.

With Shaka as his general, he attacked the Amangwane under Matiwane in about 1812 and drove them across the Buffalo river. It was the first of the Mfecane migrations – tribes displaced, latterly by the Zulus, and who in turn displaced others in a series of internecine wars.

Dingiswayo combined a number of smaller tribes to oppose his chief rival to the north, Chief Zwide of the Ndwandwe.

Death and legacy
In 1816 Shaka returned to the Zulu to claim chieftainship, while still recognising the larger Mthethwa and Dingiswayo as overlord. However, in the course of an attempted invasion of Zwide's territory, Dingiswayo was captured and beheaded by Zwide at Ngome, near Nongoma. His personal possessions were buried in his kraal. Dingiswayo's grave is on the north bank of the Tugela River, in KheKheKhe's kraal. The Mthethwa forces were defeated and scattered temporarily, with the remnants reforming under Shaka. Zwide was later defeated by Shaka in the Zulu Civil War.

Dingiswayo's career marked a watershed in the history of south-east Africa. During his exile he was exposed to European ideas and he put these into practice to produce a disciplined and highly organised army for the first time in the region. After his death, Shaka extended these ideas to create a rigidly disciplined society to complement Dingiswayo's military reforms.

References

Notes

Citations

1780 births
1817 deaths
19th-century Zulu people
Chieftainships
History of KwaZulu-Natal
Mthethwa people